The Lava Mountains are a mountain range in the Mojave Desert, in San Bernardino County, California. They are one of the eastern limits of the Fremont Valley.

References 

Mountain ranges of the Mojave Desert
Mountain ranges of Southern California
Mountain ranges of San Bernardino County, California